Mahnaz Afshar (born June 10, 1977) is an Iranian actress. She gained wide recognition in the record-breaking film Cease Fire (2006). She has received various accolades, including a Crystal Cymorgh, two Hafez Awards and an Iran's Film Critics and Writers Association Award.

Life and career

Afshar was born in Tehran, Iran. She graduated in natural science in high school. After graduation, one of her relatives who was the Theater Affairs Assistant in "Soureh" college introduced her to "Hannaneh" Art institute. Having studied video editions in the following years, she participated in the assembly job of "Ketāb-e Avval as a Golddigger" training materials, directed by Dariush Mehrjui.

Later on, she was invited by Shamsi Fazlollahi to act in a TV series called Gomshodeh (Lost) directed by Masoud Navaii, making her first official play in the TV industry. Her professional career continued by acting in a movie called "Doostam" (Friends) directed by Abdollah Eskandari. The film, however, was not released in movie theaters due to complications with the authorities regarding the story and morals of the film.

Her first official appearance as an actress in the cinema industry debuted in a work called "Shour-e Eshgh" (Passion of Love), which received positive reviews by audiences and critics of the time. Having gained substantial fame for her act, she later appeared in "Atash-bas" (Ceasefire), a major hit, and "Salad-e Fasl" (Season Salad).

Afshar is one of the judges of Persia's Got Talent, a franchise of the British talent show Got Talent, which is aired on MBC Persia.

Afshar wrote on Twitter in October 2019 that she and Yasin Ramin had divorced. ”Each person, strong or weak, has an existence. But when you decide to be a single mum, you have to have two existences. You have to be strong for yourself and your child."
In October 2022 Afshar participated in an anti-Islamic Republic demonstration in Germany but she was asked to leave the spot by angry demonstrators because of her former ties with Iran's regime.

Filmography

Film

Web

Television

References

External links 
Official website
Mahnaz Afshar On Instagram

1977 births
Living people
People from Tehran
Actresses from Tehran
Iranian film actresses
Iranian stage actresses
Iranian record producers
Iranian television actresses
20th-century Iranian actresses
21st-century Iranian actresses
Crystal Simorgh for Best Supporting Actress winners